Jason Cook may refer to:

 Jason Cook (actor) (born 1980), American actor
 Jason Cook (boxer) (born 1975), Welsh boxer
 Jason Cook (comedian) (born 1973/1974), English comedian
 Jason Cook (footballer) (born 1969), English former footballer